Michael Baumgardt, born September 12, 1966 in Berlin, Germany, is an author of computer books.

The book that leads to his international breakthrough was “Web Design with Photoshop 5.5”. First published in Germany for Photoshop 5.0 (in 1998), it was picked up by Peachpit Press in the US for version 5.5 of Photoshop and was soon published internationally in Chinese, Korean, Spanish, Portuguese and many other languages.

References

Living people
1966 births
Web designers
German computer scientists